Manuel Alexander Vargas Moreno (born 19 January 1991) is a Panamanian footballer who plays as a midfielder for San Francisco and the Panama national football team.

Career

Club
On 20 August 2020, Armenian Premier League club Lori FC announced the signing of Vargas from Santos de Nasca. On 15 October 2020, Vargas left Lori to return to Panama and sign with San Francisco.

Career Statistics

International

Statistics accurate as of match played 14 November 2017

References

External links

 

1991 births
Living people
Panamanian footballers
Panama international footballers
Association football midfielders
Armenian Premier League players
FC Lori players
Panamanian expatriate footballers
Expatriate footballers in Armenia